Rhampholeon (from  , 'bird's bill' and  , 'lion') is a genus of small chameleons, commonly known as pygmy chameleons or African leaf chameleons, found in central East Africa (extending slightly into adjacent DR Congo). They are found in forests, woodlands, thickets, and savanna, and most species are restricted to highlands. They are brown, grey, or green, and typically seen at low levels in bushes, or on the ground among grasses or leaf litter.

Species
The following 19 species are recognized as being valid.

Rhampholeon acuminatus  – Nguru pygmy chameleon
Rhampholeon beraduccii  – Beraducci’s pygmy chameleon, Mahenge pygmy chameleon
Rhampholeon boulengeri  – Boulenger's pygmy chameleon 
Rhampholeon bruessoworum  – Mount Inago pygmy chameleon
Rhampholeon chapmanorum  – Chapmans's pygmy chameleon
Rhampholeon gorongosae  – Mount Gorongosa pygmy chameleon
Rhampholeon hattinghi  
Rhampholeon marshalli  – Marshall's pygmy chameleon, Marshall's leaf chameleon, Marshall's dwarf chameleon, Marshall's stumptail chameleon 
Rhampholeon maspictus  – Mount Mabu pygmy chameleon
Rhampholeon moyeri  – Moyer’s pygmy chameleon, Udzungwa pygmy chameleon
Rhampholeon nchisiensis  – South African stumptail chameleon, Nchisi pygmy chameleon
Rhampholeon nebulauctor  – Mount Chiperone pygmy chameleon
Rhampholeon platyceps  – Mount Mulanje pygmy chameleon, Malawi stumptail chameleon
Rhampholeon spectrum  – spectral pygmy chameleon,  western pygmy chameleon, Cameroon stumptail chameleon
Rhampholeon spinosus  – rosette-nosed pygmy chameleon 
Rhampholeon temporalis  – Usambara stumptail chameleon, East Usambara pygmy chameleon
Rhampholeon tilburyi  – Mount Namuli pygmy chameleon
Rhampholeon uluguruensis  – Uluguru pygmy chameleon 
Rhampholeon viridis  – green pygmy chameleon

Nota bene: A binomial authority in parentheses indicates that the species was originally described in a genus other than Rhampholeon.

References

Further reading
Boulenger GA (1887). Catalogue of the Lizards in the British Museum (Natural History). Second Edition. Volume III. ... Chamæleontidæ. London: Trustees of the British Museum (Natural History). (Taylor and Francis, printers). xii + 575 pp. + Plates I-XL. (Genus Rhampholeon, p. 475).
Branch WR (2004). Field Guide to Snakes and other Reptiles of Southern Africa. Third Revised edition, Second impression. Sanibel Island, Florida: Ralph Curtis Books. 399 pp. . (Genus Rhampholeon, p. 228).

Goin CJ, Goin OB, Zug GR (1978). Introduction to Herpetology: Third Edition. San Francisco: W.H. Freeman and Company. xi + 378 pp. . (Genus Rhampholeon, p. 289).
Günther A (1874). "Descriptions of some new or imperfectly known Species of Reptiles from the Camaroon [sic] Mountains". Proc. Zool. Soc. London 1874: 442-445. (Rhampholeon, new genus, p. 444).

External links

 
Lizards of Africa
Lizard genera
Taxa named by Albert Günther